Alice is a village in Mé-Zóchi District, São Tomé Island in São Tomé and Príncipe. Its population is 44 (2012 census).

Population history

References

Populated places in Mé-Zóchi District